Beto Vazquez Infinity is the first album by Beto Vázquez Infinity, released on March 4, 2001.

Track listing
 "Until Dawn (Angels of Light)" - 7:39 (featuring Tarja Turunen)
 "Wizard" - 5:09 (featuring Tarja Turunen, Sabine Edelsbacher)
 "The Battle of the Past" - 4:22 (featuring Fabio Lione)
 "Sadness in the Night" - 7:02 (featuring Tarja Turunen)
 "Through Times Part I" - 1:41
 "Through Times Part II" - 2:27 (featuring Candice Night)
 "Golden Hair" - 2:46 (featuring Candice Night)
 "Infinity Space" - 4:02
 "Through Times Part III" - 4:38 (featuring Candice Night)
 "The Laws of the Future" - 4:40 (featuring Tarja Turunen, Sabine Edelsbacher)
 "Promises Under the Rain" - 5:39 (featuring Tarja Turunen, Candice Night, Sabine Edelsbacher)

Personnel

Musicians
Gonzalo Iglesias, Javier Bagata: Electric and Acoustic Guitars
Danilo Moschen: Keyboards
Beto Vazquez: String and Electric Bass
Jörg Michael: Drums
Lilah Bertolini: Flutes, Tin/Low/Medieval Whistle

Vocalists
Tarja Turunen
Candice Night
Sabine Edelsbacher
Fabio Lione

External links 
 Lyrics

2001 debut albums
Beto Vázquez Infinity albums